The Despenser reredos consists of five panels of art illustrating biblical scenes from the end of Christ's life. They were commissioned by the Bishop of Norwich, Henry Despenser, in 1382 following his destruction of a rebel peasant army at the Battle of North Walsham the previous year. Historians generally consider him to have been using the opportunity to remind the peasantry of their social position following the Peasants' revolt.

Background

Bishop Despenser

Henry Despenser ( 1341–1406) was an English nobleman and Bishop of Norwich. Destined for a career in the church from a young age, he spent much of his earlier life at the Papal curia in the service of Pope Urban V. There he fought in the papal armies against the city state of Milan during the crusade against the Visconti. The year after the Peasants' Revolt, Despenser had led an army against supporters of the antipope, Clement VII, in Ghent.

He gained the moniker 'Fighting Bishop' following his suppression of the Peasants' Revolt in East Anglia with his crushing defeat of the rebels at the Battle of North Walsham in June 1381.

Reredos

A  reredos is an altar screen which holds multiple portraits of saints. They have both decorative and practical purposes: while luxurious, they have the effect of drawing an observer's eye towards the most important—but often blandest—feature of the church, the altar.

Despenser reredos
Despenser commissioned the new reredos for St Luke's chapel in Norwich Cathedral's priory shortly after putting down the revolt in Norfolk. It comprised five sections, each devoted to a distinct aspect of Christ's final days: his flagellation, the procession to the cross wearing the crown of thorns, and finally his cruxifiction, burial and resurrection. The medievalist Sarah Beckwith has argued that the commission was directly related to the insurrection in the manner of an object lesson, suggesting that "the peasants who had dared, albeit abortively, to contest their ordained position in the social hierarchy and whose revolutionary gestures were based on an identification with Christ, are once again shown a story, a story they already know very well.

In Despenser's reredos, Christ is shown as humbly accepting his fate from those with the power to prescribe it; a similar position, says Beckwith, to the position the peasantry now found themselves in following their abortive rebellion.

Notes

References

Bibliography 

 
 
 
 
  
 
 
 
 
 

14th century in England
History of Norfolk
1382 in England
Paintings depicting the Crucifixion of Jesus
Paintings in the East of England
Altarpieces